Diiodothyronine may refer to:

 3,3'-Diiodothyronine (3,3'-T2)
 3,5-Diiodothyronine (3,5-T2)

Iodinated tyrosine derivatives
Thyroid